The Chicago Cougars were a professional ice hockey team based in Chicago, Illinois. They were members of the Western Division of the World Hockey Association (WHA). The club was founded in 1972 as one of the league's twelve original franchises. The Cougars played their home games in the International Amphitheatre. Fifty-seven players played at least one game for the club, either in the WHA regular season or the playoffs.

The Cougars made the playoffs once in their three-year existence, reaching the 1973–74 Avco World Trophy finals. Rosaire Paiement was the franchise leader in games played (234), goals (89), assists (127), and points (216). Defenseman Larry Mavety was the club's all-time leader in penalty minutes (356). Goaltender Cam Newton recorded the most wins (37).

Key

Goaltenders

Skaters

Notes

Cougars players
Chicago Cougars
Chicago Cougars players